Léon Dierx (March 31, 1838 – June 11, 1912) was a French poet born in Saint-Denis in 1838. He came to Paris to study at the Central School of Arts and Manufactures and subsequently settled there, taking up a post in the education office. He became a disciple of Leconte de Lisle and one of the most distinguished of the Parnassians. At the death of Stéphane Mallarmé in 1898 he was acclaimed prince of poets by les jeunes. His works include: Aspirations (1858); Poèmes et poésies (1864); Lèvres closes (1867); Paroles d'un vaincu (1871) ; La Rencontre, a dramatic scene (1875) and Les Amants (1879). His Poésies complètes (1872) were crowned by the French Academy. A complete edition of his works was published in 2 vols., 1894–1896.
He was made Chevalier of the Legion of Honour in 1901.

Notes

References

External links
 

1838 births
1912 deaths
People from Saint-Denis, Réunion
Writers from Réunion
French poets
Prince des poètes
Academic art
People of French descent from Réunion
French male poets
Burials at Batignolles Cemetery
Chevaliers of the Légion d'honneur
Members of the Ligue de la patrie française